Herron Island is an island in central Case Inlet in the southern part of Puget Sound in the U.S. state of Washington. The Pierce County island has a land area of 1.2326 km² (304.57 acres) and a population of 151 persons as of the 2010 census.

Herron Island is one of the few privately owned islands in Puget Sound. All access to the island is by boat, mostly aboard the HMC ferry, the "Charlie Wells", and a guest pass signed by an HMC member is necessary to board the ferry.

Corporate properties include the North Beach Park and small boat docks, the South Beach (undeveloped), roads and rights of way, Goodpastor Park and adjacent wetlands, Community Building and Fire Station, water system, ferry and ferry docks, as well as numerous greenbelt lots throughout the island. All other land is privately owned. Ownership of waterfront lots includes the tidelands down to the mean sea level.

History
Herron Island was named by Charles Wilkes during the Wilkes Expedition of 1838-1842, to honor Lewis Herron, the expedition's cooper.

Herron Island is a completely private island. It was incorporated on April 30, 1958, as Herron Maintenance Co. (HMC), a non-profit, non-stock Washington corporation consisting of the owners and purchasers of property on Herron Island. HMC is governed by its bylaws and administered by an unsalaried Board of Trustees elected annually from the membership. The Board is responsible for overseeing the operations and maintenance of the corporation's properties, and establishing a balanced budget to fund these operations. Herron Island is funded solely by annual and special assessments paid by the members and by the ferry fee.

1792

Lieutenant Peter Puget, under the command of Captain George Vancouver, explored what is now known as Case Inlet in Puget Sound, in May, 1792. On the 23rd of May, the sailors didn't get underway until 8:00 AM, much later than usual, due to the very heavy fog in the area. Because a new group of Indians was encountered at the mouth of the Nisqually river, and Lt. Puget didn't know whether they were friendly or not, the ship delayed landing until 2:00 PM that afternoon. Just after the landing, another squall, with heavy rains and wind gusts, prevented them from proceeding any further that day.

The tiny island they landed upon was dubbed "Wednesday Island". It was actually Tuesday here, but the Vancouver expedition used "England time" throughout their explorations.

The ship's botanist, Archibald Menzies, whose job it was to explore every place they landed, refused to venture from the landing site to collect soil and botanical specimens, due to the heavy rain and wind.

1841

In 1841, Lieutenant Charles Wilkes of the United States Navy, re-explored, re-charted (and frequently renamed) the islands of Puget Sound.

Large and important islands were renamed for his most important sailors. Smaller islands were renamed for his lesser sailors. Lt. Wilkes renamed Wednesday Island for Seaman Herron.

References

External links
 Herron Island
Herron Island: Blocks 2030 thru 2039, Census Tract 726.02, Pierce County, Washington United States Census Bureau

Islands of Washington (state)
Islands of Pierce County, Washington
Islands of Puget Sound
Populated places in Pierce County, Washington
Populated places on Puget Sound
Private islands of Washington (state)